Monastyrikha is a rural locality (a village) in Gorodishchenskoye Rural Settlement, Nyuksensky District, Vologda Oblast, Russia. The population was 28 as of 2002.

Geography 
Monastyrikha is located 56 km southwest of Nyuksenitsa (the district's administrative centre) by road. Khokhlovo is the nearest rural locality.

References 

Rural localities in Nyuksensky District